The Songstress (Spanish: La maja de los cantares) is a 1946 Argentine musical comedy film directed by Benito Perojo and starring Imperio Argentina and Amadeo Novoa. It is based on a novel by Armando Palacio Valdés. It is set in Andalusia.

Cast
 Imperio Argentina 
 Vicente Ariño 
 Andrés Barreta hijo   
 Gema Castillo
 María del Pilar 
 Mario Gabarrón 
 Laberinto y Terremoto 
 Amadeo Novoa 
 María Luisa Ortiz   
 Enrique San Miguel
 Conchita Soto   
 Carmelita Vázquez

References

Bibliography 
 Cecilia Cavanagh. La búsqueda de la nostalgia: afiches cinematográficos argentinos, 1934-1964. Pontificia Universidad Católica Argentina, Pabellón de las Bellas Artes, 2006.

External links 
 

1946 films
1946 musical comedy films
Argentine musical comedy films
1940s Spanish-language films
Films directed by Benito Perojo
Films set in Andalusia
Films based on Spanish novels
Argentine black-and-white films
1940s Argentine films